Karaka or New Zealand laurel (Corynocarpus laevigatus) is an evergreen tree of the family Corynocarpaceae endemic to New Zealand. It is common throughout the North and South Islands to Banks Peninsula (43°45′S) and Okarito (43°20′S), on the Three Kings Islands, on Raoul Island in the Kermadecs, and on the Chatham Islands. It is widespread in coastal habitats, often forming a major component of coastal forest, though it rarely dominates. Most botanists consider it to be native only to the northern half of the North Island, having been planted elsewhere by Māori near former village sites, and subsequently spread by birds. The common name karaka comes from the Māori language, and is also the Māori term for the colour orange, from the colour of the fruit. In the Chatham Islands, it is called kōpī, its name in the Moriori language. It is naturalised and considered invasive in Hawaii.

Description

Karaka is a leafy canopy tree with erect or spreading branches. It grows to heights  up to 15 m and has a stout trunk up to 1 m in diameter. The thick, leathery leaves are glossy, dark green above and paler beneath, 50–200 mm long, and 30–70 mm wide with petioles 10–15 mm long. In winter and spring (August to November), karaka produces stout, erect panicles of tiny flowers. Individual flowers are 4–5 mm in diameter and greenish-cream to off-white or pale yellow. The fruit is an ellipsoid to ovoid drupe 25–46 mm long, with pale yellow to orange flesh, containing a single seed. The fruit ripens in summer and autumn (January to April) and the seeds are mostly dispersed by columbiform birds which eat the fruit.

Ecology
This evergreen tree is a popular place for smaller birds to sleep during the winter. It is of great value to birds and other fauna, including invertebrates that feed on the fruits and disperse the seeds. The ability to bear fruit in early summer (January) gives this plant an important ecological value, being a good food source for many species, especially birds, at a time when most other berries are not yet ripe. Centuries ago the seeds would have been dispersed by moa and possibly other large birds. Today only kererū are known to disperse karaka seeds, although there are reports of blackbirds pecking at fruits carrying them away from the tree if disturbed. Most of the seed crop lies beneath the tree where carpets of shade suppressed seedlings grow.

Cultivation
Karaka may be easily grown from fresh seed, but cuttings are very difficult to strike. Young plants are frost-tender and sensitive to cold. The tree often naturalises in suitable habitats. It is common in cultivation and widely available for sale both in New Zealand and in suitable climates elsewhere. It was one of the most grown food crops by pre-European Māori (alongside kūmara (sweet potato) and aruhe (bracken fern root), who ate the drupe and seed after a long detoxification process.

Every autumn (March to May), pre-European Māori would collect the seeds dropped from the coastal karaka trees. The seeds would be placed in open-weave kete, washed in rivers to remove the outer pulp, afterwards baked and sun dried, a process that would remove toxicity from the seeds. Properly prepared karaka kernels would keep for 2–3 years.

Toxicity and uses
The pulp of ripe fruit is edible, sweet and aromatic, but the fresh kernels contain the toxic alkaloid karakin. Accounts from the 19th century record that extensive processing was used by Māori to convert the kernels to an edible form, and mention that if the processing was not done with the greatest care, poisoning would result with symptoms including violent convulsions and severe muscle spasms which could leave the limbs permanently fixed in contorted positions. Death resulted in a few cases.

The berries are toxic if ingested by dogs and may result in death. There is also evidence from beekeepers that the flowers may be narcotic or toxic to bees, causing bee loss and resulting in lower honey production.

Culture
On the Chatham Islands this tree (locally known as kopi) has played a distinguished role in the history of Moriori people: the soft bark of these trees has been used for making dendroglyphs. A report in 2000 noted the existence of 147 kopi trees with dendroglyphs, though some may not have been authentically Moriori.

References

External links

 Karaka leaves used for scientific research

Corynocarpaceae
Trees of New Zealand
Ornamental trees
Plants described in 1776